Carol Eckman (January 11, 1938 – July 30, 1985 in Williamsport, PA, USA) was an American women's basketball coach and was known as the "Mother of the Women’s Collegiate Basketball Championship".

She was the basketball coach at West Chester University from 1967–72 and helped organize the first collegiate women’s basketball championship tournament in 1969. The annual Carol Eckman Award is given by the Women's Basketball Coaches Association to a women's college basketball coach.

Her team, the Golden Rams, won the national championship game in each of the next three years. She had a 68-5 record in her five seasons as the coach of West Chester University.

In 1999, she was inducted into the Women's Basketball Hall of Fame.

References

External links
 Carol Eckman Integrity in Coaching Award

American women's basketball coaches
Year of birth missing
1985 deaths
Date of death missing